Ogunboye Iyanu Ezekiel (born June 26, 1992 in Lagos) is a Nigerian footballer (Striker) currently playing for Kuala Lumpur FA in Malaysia Premier League.

Honours

Individual honours

References

External links
Stanley Ogunboye Statistics

1992 births
Living people
Nigerian footballers
Expatriate footballers in Malaysia
Association football forwards
Yoruba sportspeople
Sportspeople from Lagos
Kuala Lumpur City F.C. players
DRB-Hicom F.C. players